Kushmanda is a Hindu goddess, credited with creating the world with her divine smile. Followers of the Kalikula tradition believe her to be the fourth aspect in Navadurga forms of Mahadevi. Her name signals her main role: Ku means "a little", Ushma means "warmth" or "energy" and Anda means "cosmic egg".

Kushmanda is worshiped on the fourth day of the festival of Navaratri (nine nights of Navadurga) and is believed to improve health and bestow wealth and strength.
Goddess Kushmanda has eight hands and is thus also known as Ashtabhuja Devi. It is believed that all the power to bestow Siddhis and Niddhis are located in her Jap Mala.

It is stated that She created the whole universe, which is called Brahmanda (ब्रह्माण्ड) in Sanskrit, by just flashing little bit of her smile. She also likes Bali of white pumpkin known as Kushmanda (कुष्माण्ड). Due to her association with Brahmanda and Kushmanda, She is popularly known as Goddess Kushmanda. Her abode is in Anahata chakra.

Form
Kushmanda is depicted with eight to ten hands holding a trident, discus, sword, hook, mace, bow, arrow and two jars of honey (Elixir) and blood. Her one hand is always on abhayamudra from which she blesses all her devotees. She rides on a lion.

Origin
It is about the time when the universe was no more than a void full of darkness. There were no indications of the world anywhere. But then a ray of divine light, which is ever existing, spread everywhere, illuminating each and every nook of the void. This sea of light was formless.
Suddenly, it started taking a definite size, and finally looked like a Divine Lady, who was none other than Goddess Kushmanda herself. The birth of the universe occurred because of the silent smile of Goddess Kushmanda. She was the one who produced the Cosmic egg. Her smile sent away the entirety of the darkness and thus formed a new creation of the universe.
She gave light and life to the entire universe with her silent smile. The earth, planets, sun, stars and the galaxies were all brought into being. But to sustain life, the world needed the sun God. So, the Goddess centred herself in between the sun and she became the cause of the energy and light necessary for life.
The sun gives life to the world and Goddess Kushmanda herself is the power of the sun and is the source of all energy when she resides within the core of the Sun God. It was to create a balance in the universe and provide life to all living beings from the sun rays, her power gives the sun its capability to give life to everyone, as she herself is Shakti.

She is the source of Lord Surya's power. Without her, Surya's light and energy will grow dim and fade away and will become powerless. Lord Surya gives life to creation, but she is also the one who is responsible for it too. It is her power that makes him capable of doing so, and when Mahashakti appears in the form of Kushmanda, it is what she does.
From her smile, a body of energy came forth from her and from that potent energy, came forth light and creation. She always smiles when the Gods, inferior people and other celestial beings honored her.

When the universe was non-existent and darkness prevailed everywhere, Maa Kushmanda produced the Cosmic egg, bringing light to the universe. Kushmanda has the power and strength to live in the core of Sun. Her luminosity gives the Sun its brightness. She is said to give directions to the Sun God, Surya.

See also
 Shaktism
 Adi Parashakti

References

Forms of Parvati
 
Solar goddesses
Creator goddesses